The 78th Regiment, (Highland) Regiment of Foot also known as the 78th Fraser Highlanders was a British infantry regiment of the line raised in Scotland in 1757, to fight in the Seven Years' War (also known as the French and Indian War in the US.). The 78th Regiment was one of the first three Highland Regiments to fight in North America.

History
The regiment was raised in Inverness by Lieutenant-Colonel Simon Fraser of Lovat as the 2nd Highland Battalion and ranked as the 62nd Regiment of Foot in 1757. It was re-ranked as the 63rd Regiment of Foot later in the year. The regiment embarked for Halifax, Nova Scotia in July 1757 to take part in the Seven Years' War. Having been renamed the 78th (Highland) Regiment of Foot, or Fraser's Highlanders in June 1758, it took part in the Siege of Louisbourg later that month, the Battle of the Plains of Abraham in September 1759 and the Montreal Campaign in August 1760. During the war, the regiment suffered 103 soldiers killed and 383 wounded.

The regiment was disbanded in Quebec in December 1763, with each man offered a grant of land if they stayed in Canada. Of those who accepted the offer, upward of 300 joined the 84th Royal Highland Emigrants when it was raised in 1775.

Colonels
Colonels of the regiment were:
1757–1761 Lieutenant-Colonel Simon Fraser of Lovat
1761–1763 Major John Campbell of Ballimore

See also
78th Fraser Highlanders Pipe Band, a pipe band from Campbellville, Ontario (in the Toronto area) with the same name but with no affiliation to the regiment.
71st Regiment of Foot, Fraser's Highlanders, a later regiment also raised by Simon Fraser of Lovat but for the American Revolutionary War

References

Further reading

External links
 Stewart Museum page on regiment's history
 Reenactment group, Montreal, Quebec
 Reenactment group, Indianapolis, USA ( 2009-10-22)
 78th Frasers in Canada: A people's History
 Calgary garrison website
 78th Fraser Highlanders, Fort St-Andrew's, Québec City

Infantry regiments of the British Army
Highland regiments
Military units and formations established in 1757
Military units and formations disestablished in 1763
1757 establishments in Scotland